Following is a list of senators of Cantal, people who have represented the department of Cantal in the Senate of France.

Third Republic

Senators for Cantal under the French Third Republic were:

 Jules Bertrand (1876–1882)
 Félix Esquirou (Parieu) (1876–1885)
 Jean Brugerolle (1882–1884)
 Léon Cabanes (1885–1886)
 Joseph Cabanes (1885–1891)
 Paul Deves (1886–1899)
 Albert Baduel (1891–1903)
 Francis Charmes (1900–1912)
 Eugène Lintilhac (1903–1920)
 Gabriel Peschaud (1912–1920)
 Noël Cazals (1921–1930)
 Frédéric François-Marsal (1921–1930)
 Louis Dauzier (1929–1945)
 Henri Brunel (1930–1939)
 Stanislas (Castellane) (1938–1945)

Fourth Republic

Senators for Cantal under the French Fourth Republic were:

 Hector Peschaud (1946–1959)
 Paul Piales (1948–1959)

Fifth Republic 
Senators for Cantal under the French Fifth Republic:

References

Sources

 
Lists of members of the Senate (France) by department